Dallas City FC  (DCFC) is an American soccer club based in McKinney, Texas. DCFC competes in the National Premier Soccer League (NPSL) as a member of the Heartland Conference of the South Region. The club changed their name before beginning play in the NPSL. Early in 2017, it was announced that the club would no longer compete in the NPSL. However, when the 2017 season began, the NPSL listed DCFC in the standings in the place of Liverpool Warriors. The primary rival of DCFC in the NPSL is Fort Worth Vaqueros FC. The two clubs annually compete in a cup competition, the Trinity River Cup, which is a two-leg total goal series.

Honors
2017 Trinity River Cup Champions
2016 Trinity River Cup Champions
2015 Trinity River Cup Champions
2014 East Dallas Cup Champions
2014 Trinity River Cup Champions
2014 South Region Runners-up

Notable
Team's manager Rahim Zafer is a former professional international soccer player who played in the Turkish Super League with multiple teams including Besiktas JK. He was a part of the UEFA Champions League 2000 - 2001 Besiktas JK team squad who beat FC Barcelona 3-0 on September 19, 2000 in Istanbul Inonu Stadium.

References

External links
Official website

Association football clubs established in 2013
National Premier Soccer League teams
Soccer clubs in Dallas
2013 establishments in Texas